Liam Hayes (born 1974) is an Irish retired hurler who played as a full-back for the Cork intermediate team.

Born in Dromina, County Cork, Hayes first arrived on the inter-county scene at the age of twenty-four when he first linked up with the Cork intermediate team. Although he never played senior hurling for Cork, Hayes won two All-Ireland medals and three Munster medal in the intermediate grade.

At club level Hayes is a one-time championship medallist with Avondhu. He also won a championship medal in the junior grade with Dromina.

In retirement from playing Hayes has become involved in team management and coaching. As manager of the Cork intermediate team he guided them to All-Ireland and Munster titles. Hayes later served as a selector with the Cork under-21 team.

Honours

Player

Dromina
Cork Junior Hurling Championship (1): 2003

Avondhu
Cork Senior Hurling Championship (1): 1996

Cork
All-Ireland Intermediate Hurling Championship (2): 2001, 2004
Munster Intermediate Hurling Championship (3): 2000, 2001, 2004

Manager

Cork
All-Ireland Intermediate Hurling Championship (1): 2014
Munster Intermediate Hurling Championship (1): 2014

References

1974 births
Living people
Dromina hurlers
Avondhu hurlers
Cork inter-county hurlers
Hurling managers
Hurling selectors